Ameerah Anakaona Bello (born October 3, 1975) is a sprinter who represents the United States Virgin Islands. She competed in the women's 100 metres at the 2000 Summer Olympics.

References

External links
 

1975 births
Living people
Athletes (track and field) at the 1995 Pan American Games
Athletes (track and field) at the 1996 Summer Olympics
Athletes (track and field) at the 2000 Summer Olympics
United States Virgin Islands female sprinters
Olympic track and field athletes of the United States Virgin Islands
Place of birth missing (living people)
Pan American Games competitors for the United States Virgin Islands
Olympic female sprinters
21st-century American women